The Medea class were a class of destroyers that were being built for the Greek Navy at the outbreak of World War I but were taken over and completed for the Royal Navy for wartime service. All were named after characters from Greek mythology as result of their Greek heritage.

The Medeas were a private design roughly similar to their various Royal Navy M-class contemporaries. They had three funnels, the foremost of which was taller, and unusually, the mainmast was taller than the foremast, giving rise to a distinctive appearance.  They shipped three single QF 4 inch guns, one on the forecastle, one between the first two funnels and the third on the quarterdeck.

Ships

Bibliography

Destroyers of the Royal Navy, 1893-1981, Maurice Cocker, 1983, Ian Allan 
Jane's Fighting Ships, 1919, Jane's Publishing

Destroyer classes
 
Ship classes of the Royal Navy
Medea class